Phi Alpha was a historically Jewish Fraternity founded in 1914. It merged with Phi Sigma Delta in 1959. Ten years later, that fraternity merged with Zeta Beta Tau.

History
Phi Alpha was founded at George Washington University on October 14, 1914.

Five founders were honored:
 David Davis
 Edward Lewis
 Hyman Shapiro
 Reuben Schmidt
 Maurice H. Herzmark 
The first pledge ceremony was held in February 1915, and was followed by the establishment of a chapter house. Dr. Edward Cafritz transferred to University of Maryland, Baltimore and helped start Beta chapter, which was installed on February 22, 1916. This was followed by Gamma chapter at Georgetown University on December 26, 1916.

On April 6, 1959 the fraternity merged with Phi Sigma Delta, retiring the name Phi Alpha. That fraternity's records note that there were sixteen active Phi Alpha chapters at the time of the merger. Both fraternities had chapters at three campuses, two of which were "readily resolved," and in the case of the third, this chapter was released to join another fraternity.

Ten years later Phi Sigma Delta itself merged with Zeta Beta Tau.

Traditions, Milestones and Insignia
In 1921, Phi Alpha became a member of the National Interfraternity Conference. In 1926, the fraternity was incorporated nationally. Its national convention was held annually during the latter part of December.

Its magazine, the Phi Alpha Quarterly began publication in 1917. Its member-only, "esoteric" publication was the Phi Alpha Bulletin.

The Fraternity's badge was a gold plaque, rectangular, and wider than it was tall, superimposed with the raised letters ΦΑ and surrounded with a row of pearls. Its flower was the rose. The pledge button was circular, containing a blue circle within a red circle.

Chapters
This is the list of chapters of Phi Alpha fraternity, prior to its merger into Phi Sigma Delta in 1959, then Zeta Beta Tau in 1969. Citations taken from Baird's Manual and checked against ZBT's referenced list.

See also
 List of Jewish fraternities and sororities

References

Defunct former members of the North American Interfraternity Conference
Zeta Beta Tau
Student organizations established in 1914
Historically Jewish fraternities in the United States
1914 establishments in Washington, D.C.
Jewish organizations established in 1914